ICANN created an experimental set of top-level internationalized domain names in October 2007 for the purpose of testing the use of Internationalizing Domain Names in Applications (IDNA) in the root zone and within those domains. ICANN announced that these domains would be removed from the root zone of the Domain Name System effective on 31 October 2013. They no longer resolve but are still listed in the IANA Root Zone Database.  Each of these TLDs names encoded a word meaning "test" in the respective language.

The zone file for each of these domains contained only one second-level name, encoding the word "example" in the respective script and language. Each example.test name resolved to a host where ICANN operated a test wiki on behalf of the corresponding user community.

IDN Test TLDs

References

Internationalized domain names